Rimbach-près-Masevaux (variant form of name: Rimpach) is a commune in the Haut-Rhin department in Grand Est in north-eastern France.

Villages, hamlets and quarters in the commune: Basse Bers (Niederebersche, Unterbers, Untere Bers), Ermensbach (Armspach, Ermenspach, Ermerspach, Ermspach), Grossenberg (Grosberg), Haute Bers (Oberenbers), Horben (Horb), Johannesberg (Johannisberg, Sankt Johannisberg), Langmatt (Langmatte), Neuerbet (Neu Arbet, Neu Erbet), Riedelsbourg (Riedelsburg), Riesenwald, Ruchberg

Population

See also
 Communes of the Haut-Rhin department

Bibliography
 Patrimoine Dollar, the bulletin of the Société d'Histoire de la Vallée de Masevaux, publishes articles on Rimbach-près-Masevaux.  Information on this journal can be obtained from the secrétaire-correspondent: M. Jean-Marie Ehret, 8 place de la Mairie, 68290 Oberbruck
 Two volumes of postcard views of this valley, compiled by Jean-Marie Ehret, Monique and Georges Redhaber, Bernard Sutter and Daniel Willmé, have been published by the Centre de Ressources des Vosges du Sud: La vallée de Masevaux à l'orée du siècle (1894–1914) (1995) and La vallée de Masevaux 1914-1918 (1997). Information can be obtained from: M. Armand Laurent, 1 rue du Buhl, 68290 Dolleren
 Historical and genealogical information from the Centre Départemental d'Histoire des Familles in Guebwiller:  Rimbach-près-Masevaux

See also
Communes of the Haut-Rhin department

References

Communes of Haut-Rhin